The Islamic Azad University (IAU; , Dāneshgāh-e Āzād-e Eslāmi) is a private university system headquartered in Tehran, Iran. It is one of the largest comprehensive systems of universities, colleges, and community colleges in the world. Besides Iran, the university has international satellite branches in countries such as Afghanistan, the United Arab Emirates, Lebanon and England.

History
Headquartered in Tehran, Iran, the Islamic Azad University is the world's sixth-largest university. It was approved and ratified by the Supreme Council of the Cultural Revolution in 1982, having been founded and established by Akbar Hashemi Rafsanjani. It has an enrollment of 1 million students. Since its inception in 1982, it has grown both physically and academically to become one of the largest higher education institutions globally. Over the years, IAU has promoted 'higher education for all' as its key objective. IAU has two independent and 31 state university branches across Iran, and four branches in other countries: the U.A.E., the United Kingdom, Lebanon and Afghanistan. Over the years, the university has accumulated assets estimated to be worth $20–25 billion.

The Islamic Azad University's activities quickly expanded throughout the country, so that today thousands of students are enrolling every year. Not relying on government funding, it receives charitable donations and charges tuition fees.

The certificates issued by this university are recognized by the Ministry of Science, Research and Technology and Ministry of Health and Medical Education for medical education. The university admits students through the National Wide Entrance Examination held by the National (Iranian) Organization of Educational Testing.

Endowment controversy
Iran's supreme leader has declared the financial endowment of Islamic Azad University to be "religiously illegitimate and unlawful", prompting a change within the administration of the institution.

Governance
 The Board of Founders
 The Board of Trustees
 The President of the university
 The University Council

Board of Founders
The board consists of nine people, including Ali Akbar Velayati (Head of Board), Abdollah Jassbi, Ali Akbar Nategh-Nouri, Hassan Khomeini, Mohsen Qomi, Akbar Hashemi Rafsanjani, Abdul-Karim Mousavi Ardebili, Hamid Mirzadeh and one vacant position.

Board of Trustees
Members include:
 Three members of full-time associated or higher rank professor faculty of the universities approved by the Supreme Council of Cultural Revolution (Mohammad Mehdi Tehranchi, Farhad Rahbar, Fereidoun Azizi)
 Three members of the founding board, including at least one member of the clergy  (Ali Akbar Velayati (Head of Board), Abdollah Jassbi, Hassan Khomeini)
 The Ministers of Science, Research and Technology and Health and Medical Education or their representatives
 The head of the Supreme Leader's representative in universities or his deputy
 The president of the university (Board Secretary)

Board of Directors
The administration of the university is the Rector of the University Board of Trustees and approved the proposal of the Supreme Council of the Cultural Revolution and the decision of the President of the board of trustees is appointed for a term of four years. All Islamic Azad University campuses are governed by the Regents of the university.

Presidents

Organization and administration

Central Organization (University System):
Vice Presidency for Research, Technology and Innovation
Vice Presidency for Student and Cultural Affairs
Vice Presidency for Development and Resource Management (Financial and Administrative Affairs)
Vice Presidency for International Affairs and Non-Iranian Students
Vice Presidency for Science, Engineering and Agriculture (Academic and Post Graduate Affairs)
Vice Presidency for Medical Sciences
Vice Presidency for Humanities and Arts
Vice Presidency for Parliamentary Affairs and Social Relations
Vice Presidency for General Education and Skills Training (Sama)
Research Institute and Laboratory Networks
Science and Technology Park
Center of Admissions
Center for Martyrs and Veterans Affairs
Center for Provincial Board of Trustees
Center for Audit of the Board of Trustees
Center of Construction and Real Estate
Center of Monitoring, Inspection and Complaints
Policy Institute of Strategic Studies
Law Office
Cultural Center of Imam Khomeini and the Islamic Revolution
Knowledge Based Economy and Finance Council
Trading Commission
Research and Technology Fund

Branches and campuses
The Islamic Azad University has two independent and 31 state university branches with 321 campuses in Iran, and four branches overseas, as well as a range of research centers, hospitals, laboratories, workshops, sports facilities, recreational areas and ICT facilities. It now welcomes not only local but also international students. There are 767 Sama schools affiliated to the university, along with 116 skill and entrepreneurship colleges.

These campuses are under the direct control of the board of trustees and the President. The best known and famous branches are listed below. The most distinguished, most highly ranked and most prestigious, are Central Tehran and Science and Research.

Campuses in the City of Tehran

Two-year institutions
Vice Presidency for General Education and Skills Training:
 116 skill and entrepreneurship colleges
 Skills Training Schools

Educational institutions (K-12)
Vice Presidency for General Education and Skills Training:
 Sama Schools (767 pre schools, primary schools, secondary schools, elementary schools, middle schools, high schools and university-preparatory schools)

Overseas branches
The Azad University in Oxford (AUO) at the outskirts of the city of Oxford in the UK, was established in 2004 to support IAU's international collaboration activities. Through its links with the UK universities and research centers, the AUO provides services to the students and staff of IAU as well as other students and organisations around the world.

In 1995, a branch was opened in Dubai.

International offices
The Islamic Azad University has international offices in Russia, Italy, Germany, the UK, UAE, Lebanon and Afghanistan.

State universities
IAU has 31 state universities (provincial universities) located throughout the provinces of Iran. Digits in parentheses indicate the number of branches in current province.

 Islamic Azad University, Alborz Province (3)
 Islamic Azad University, Ardabil Province (8)
 Islamic Azad University, East Azerbaijan Province (27)
 Islamic Azad University, West Azerbaijan Province (10)
 Islamic Azad University, Bushehr Province (11)
 Islamic Azad University, Chahar Mahaal and Bakhtiari Province (3)
 Islamic Azad University, Fars Province (30)
 Islamic Azad University, Gilan Province (12)
 Islamic Azad University, Golestan Province (10)
 Islamic Azad University, Hamadan Province (6)
 Islamic Azad University, Hormozgan Province (12)
 Islamic Azad University, Ilam Province (5)
 Islamic Azad University, Isfahan Province (24)
 Islamic Azad University, Kerman Province (12)
 Islamic Azad University, Kermanshah Province (8)
 Islamic Azad University, North Khorasan Province (4)
 Islamic Azad University, Razavi Khorasan Province (14)
 Islamic Azad University, South Khorasan Province (4)
 Islamic Azad University, Khuzestan Province (17)
 Islamic Azad University, Kohgiluyeh and Boyer-Ahmad Province (3)
 Islamic Azad University, Kurdistan Province (6)
 Islamic Azad University, Lorestan Province (6)
 Islamic Azad University, Markazi Province (15)
 Islamic Azad University, Mazandaran Province (14)
 Islamic Azad University, Qazvin Province (4)
 Islamic Azad University, Qom Province (1)
 Islamic Azad University, Semnan Province (7)
 Islamic Azad University, Sistan and Baluchestan Province (7)
 Islamic Azad University, Tehran Province (24)
 Islamic Azad University, Yazd Province (10)
 Islamic Azad University, Zanjan Province (4)

Admissions
From the establishment of Islamic Azad University in 1982 to 2013, the admission process of students was through Islamic Azad University's entrance exam which was designed, held, and scored independently by the private university system. Post-2013, its entrance exam was merged with the Public University System. It holds the national entrance exam and some students who get admitted through this process would be exempt from paying any tuitions. However, Islamic Azad University requires tuition which varies by different factors such as program, degree, and location.

The university accepts nearly 320,000 students annually (10,000 PhD, 3,000 Professional Doctorate and Medicine, 57,000 Masters, 200,000 Bachelors and 50,000 Associates).

Distribution of students
In the academic year 2021–2022:

Distribution of graduates
In the academic year 2021–2022:

Medical centers
IAU' medical centers include:

(Not included Veterinary Medicine and Clinical and Health Psychology)

 107 branches in medical sciences
 1669 faculty members
 43,728 medical sciences students
 72 majors in different levels

There are 825 active beds in 10 hospitals in Iran, and has 1273 approval beds. Each medical center serves as the primary teaching site for that campus's medical school. Some hospitals are listed below:
 Farhikhtegan Hospital in Tehran, Iran
 Bou-Ali (Avicenna) Hospital in Tehran, Iran
 Amiralmomenin Hospital in Tehran, Iran
 Javaheri Hospital in Tehran, Iran
 22 Baham Hospital in Mashhad, Iran
 Aria Hospital in Mashhad, Iran
 Yazd Hospital
 Khatamalanbia Hospital
 Rhazes Hospital
 Katalem Hospital

Rankings

U.S. News & World Report rankings

2023 Best Global Universities Ranking
Global Ranking: 394
Regional (Asia) Ranking: 77
Country Ranking: 2

Subject ranking
Agricultural Sciences: 117
Artificial Intelligence: 55
Biology and Biochemistry: 299
Biotechnology and Applied Microbiology: 136
Chemical Engineering: 36
Chemistry: 136
Civil Engineering: 14
Clinical Medicine: 644
Computer Science: 234
Condensed Matter Physics: 124
Electrical and Electronic Engineering: 110
Energy and Fuels: 40
Engineering: 37
Environment/Ecology: 367
Food Science and Technology: 84
Geosciences: 385
Materials Science: 267
Mathematics: 29
Mechanical Engineering: 4
Optics: 83
Pharmacology and Toxicology: 181
Physical Chemistry: 90
Physics: 200
Plant and Animal Science: 356
Polymer Science: 9
Water Resources: 30

2022 Best Global Universities Ranking
Global Ranking: 434
Regional (Asia) Ranking: 75
Country Ranking: 2

Subject ranking
Agricultural Sciences: 114
Biology and Biochemistry: 379
Biotechnology and Applied Microbiology: 152
Chemical Engineering: 36
Chemistry: 145
Civil Engineering: 15
Clinical Medicine: 694
Computer Science: 160
Condensed Matter Physics: 116
Electrical and Electronic Engineering: 115
Energy and Fuels: 36
Engineering: 44
Environment/Ecology: 378
Food Science and Technology: 77
Geosciences: 346
Materials Science: 244
Mathematics: 45
Mechanical Engineering: 3
Nanoscience and Nanotechnology: 247
Optics: 118
Pharmacology and Toxicology: 229
Physical Chemistry: 98
Physics: 205
Plant and Animal Science: 389
Polymer Science: 27

2021 Best Global Universities Ranking
Global Ranking: 445
Regional (Asia) Ranking: 72
Country Ranking: 2

Subject ranking
Agricultural Sciences: 117
Biology and Biochemistry: 441
Biotechnology and Applied Microbiology: 176
Chemical Engineering: 29
Chemistry: 110
Civil Engineering: 23
Clinical Medicine: 725
Computer Science: 193
Electrical and Electronic Engineering: 105
Energy and Fuels: 39
Engineering: 47
Environment/Ecology: 373
Materials Science: 232
Mathematics: 31
Mechanical Engineering: 1
Nanoscience and Nanotechnology: 204
Physics: 228
Plant and Animal Science: 397

2020 Best Global Universities Ranking
Global Ranking: 454
Regional (Asia) Ranking: 69
Country Ranking: 2

Subject ranking
Agricultural Sciences: 84
Biology and Biochemistry: 466
Chemistry: 121
Civil Engineering: 35
Computer Science: 110
Electrical and Electronic Engineering: 93
Engineering: 44
Materials Science: 225
Mathematics: 29
Mechanical Engineering: 5
Physics: 235
Plant and Animal Science: 432

2018 Best Global Universities Ranking
Global Ranking: 497
Regional (Asia) Ranking: 76
Country Ranking: 2

Subject ranking
Agricultural Sciences: 132
Chemistry: 136
Computer Science: 119
Engineering: 38
Materials Science: 104
Mathematics: 21
Physics: 369

CWUR - The Center for World University Rankings
2021-2022 Ranking:
World Rank: 372
National Rank: 1
Quality of Education Rank: NA
Alumni Employment Rank: NA
Quality of Faculty Rank: NA
Research Performance Rank: 342
Overall Score: 75.7

SciVisions rankings
2017: International rank: 938, National rank: 5, Regional Rank: 24 (SRBIAU)

SCImago rankings
2013: International rank: 87, National rank: 1, Regional Rank: 1

2012: International rank: 231, National rank: 1, Regional Rank: 2

CWTS Leiden Ranking

2014: World rank: 252, Country rank: 11, Regional rank: 194

URAP – University Ranking by Academic Performance

2013: World rank: 161, Country rank: 1, Regional rank: 25

2012: World rank: 226, Country rank: 2, Regional rank: 34

ISC rankings

Gallery

See also
 Colleges and universities
 Higher Education in Iran
 List of universities in Iran - including list of IAU branches
 Islamic Azad University, Science and Research Branch
 Islamic Azad University, Central Tehran Branch
 Islamic Azad University, South Tehran Branch
 Islamic Azad University, North Tehran Branch
 Islamic Azad University, Najafabad Branch
 Islamic Azad University, UAE Branch

References

External links 
 
  
 Alumni of Islamic Azad University 

 
1982 establishments in Iran
Educational institutions established in 1982
Engineering universities and colleges in Iran